Koptelov may refer to:

 Asteroid 3968 Koptelov, named after Afanasij Lazarevich Koptelov, Soviet writer
 Evgeny Koptelov (born 1998), Russian swimmer